The Department of Industry, Science and Tourism (also called DIST) was an Australian government department that existed between March 1996 and October 1998.

Scope
Information about the department's functions and/or government funding allocation could be found in the Administrative Arrangements Orders, the annual Portfolio Budget Statements, in the Department's annual reports and on the Department's website.

According to the Administrative Arrangements Order (AAO) made on 11 March 1996, the Department dealt with:
Manufacturing and commerce including industries development
Science and technology, including industrial research and development
Export services
Marketing, including export promotion, of manufactures and services
Investment promotion
Small business
Tourism, including the tourist industry and participation in international expositions
Construction industry
Duties of customs and excise
Bounties on the production of goods
Offsets, to the extent not dealt with by the Department of Defence
Patents of inventions and designs, and trade marks
Consumer affairs
Weights and measures
Civil space program

Structure
The Department was an Australian Public Service department, staffed by officials who were responsible to the Minister for Industry, Science and Tourism, John Moore. As at 1997, the Department was headed by a Secretary, and had nine divisions, six state offices and eight overseas posts. The Secretary of the Department was Greg Taylor (until December 1996) and then Russell Higgins.

References

Ministries established in 1996
Industry, Science and Tourism
1998 disestablishments in Australia
1996 establishments in Australia